Charles Bruce, 3rd Earl of Ailesbury (later styled Aylesbury) and 4th Earl of Elgin (29 May 1682 – 10 February 1747), of Ampthill, Bedfordshire and Savernake Park, Wiltshire, styled Viscount Bruce of Ampthill from 1685 to 1741, was a British landowner and Tory politician who sat in the English and British House of Commons from 1705 until 1711 when he was raised to the peerage as one of Harley's Dozen and sat in the House of Lords.

Background

Bruce was the son of Thomas Bruce, 2nd Earl of Ailesbury and his first wife  Lady Elizabeth Seymour, daughter of Henry Seymour, Lord Beauchamp and Mary Capell. His father was arrested for treason in 1696 and confined to the Tower of London, and his mother died in premature childbirth in 1697, a death probably brought on by a false report that his father had been executed. His father was allowed to leave England soon afterwards: he spent the rest of his life in Flanders, and quickly became content there. He made a happy second marriage to the Belgian noblewoman Charlotte d'Argenteau, comtesse d'Esneux: his children visited him regularly and became deeply attached to their stepmother. The English Crown made no effort to seize the family estates so that there was enough money to allow Bruce to live in comfort.

Public life
Bruce was returned to Parliament for Great Bedwyn at the 1705 English general election, and was returned again at the 1708 British general election. At the 1710 British general election, he was returned for both Great Bedwyn and Marlborough and chose to sit for the latter. In December 1711 he was summoned to the House of Lords through a writ of acceleration in his father's junior title Baron Bruce of Whorlton. In 1741 he succeeded his father in the earldoms of Elgin and Ailesbury. With his two sons having predeceased him, he was in 1746 created Baron Bruce, of Tottenham in the County of Wilts, with a special remainder to his nephew the Honourable Thomas Brudenell.

Family
Lord Ailesbury married, firstly, Lady Anne Savile, daughter of William Savile, 2nd Marquess of Halifax. They had four children:

Hon. Robert Bruce (d. 30 August 1738), married Frances Blackett (d. 16 July 1750), daughter of Sir William Blackett, 1st Baronet, of Newcastle-upon-Tyne, childless.
Hon. George Bruce (born before 1717).
Lady Mary Bruce (1710 – 14 August 1738), married (1728) Henry Brydges, 2nd Duke of Chandos and had children.
Lady Elizabeth Bruce, married (1732) the Honourable Benjamin Bathurst, son of Allen Bathurst, 1st Earl Bathurst, childless.

After his first wife's death in July 1717, Lord Ailesbury married, secondly, Lady Juliana Boyle, daughter of Charles Boyle, 2nd Earl of Burlington. They had no children. After her death in March 1739, he married, thirdly, aged 47, the 18-year-old Lady Caroline Campbell, daughter of John Campbell, 4th Duke of Argyll, in 1739. They had one daughter:

Lady Mary Bruce (16 April 1740 - 5 November 1796), married (1757) Charles Lennox, 3rd Duke of Richmond, childless.

Because neither of his sons survived him or left children, upon his death, the earldom of Elgin and subsidiary Scottish peerages were inherited by his cousin the Earl of Kincardine, while the earldom of Ailesbury and subsidiary English peerages became extinct. The barony of Bruce of Tottenham created for him in 1746 passed upon his death the next year according to the special remainder to his nephew Thomas Brudenell. His Scottish lordship of Kinloss was subsequently determined to have devolved upon James Brydges, 3rd Duke of Chandos, who, however, did not claim the title. The Countess of Ailesbury and Elgin married as her second husband Henry Seymour Conway, by whom she had the sculptor Anne Seymour Damer. She died in January 1803, aged 82.

References

|-

|-

1682 births
1747 deaths
Bruce, Charles Bruce, Viscount
Bruce, Charles Bruce, Viscount
Bruce, Charles Bruce, Viscount
4
Charles
Charles
Bruce, Charles Bruce, Viscount
Bruce, Charles Bruce, Viscount
Members of Parliament for Great Bedwyn
Members of Parliament for Marlborough
Charles